Gabe Baron Mirkin (born 18 June 1935) is a physician, author, professor, columnist, former guest lecturer, and a former marathon runner who hosted a radio show on health and fitness for more than 20 years, and wrote several books on sports medicine, nutrition, and health.

Mirkin is commonly known for his recommendations on standard medicine, as well as his non-standard recommendations on health concerns, and his criticism for preliminary medical research findings without appropriate verified resources.  Due to his unconventional recommendations, he also receives criticism from other doctors.

Education 
Mirkin is a graduate of Harvard University and the Baylor University College of Medicine.  He is board-certified in four areas: allergy and immunology, pediatrics, pediatric allergy, and a now-defunct board of sports medicine.  He did his residency at the Massachusetts General Hospital, and fellowship at Johns Hopkins.

Career

Teaching  
Mirkin served as an assistant professor at the University of Maryland, teaching a course based on his book The Sportsmedicine Book from 1976 to 1980.  He served as a teaching fellow at Johns Hopkins Medical School, and an associate clinical professor in pediatrics at the Georgetown University School of Medicine in Washington, D.C.

Writing  
Mirkin wrote The Sportsmedicine Book, which discusses proper diet, exercise, and sports injuries. He has written a total of 16 books, and has written a chapter on sports medicine for the Merck Manual.

Mirkin has written a number of syndicated columns on sports medicine which appeared weekly in 31 newspapers, and was a contributor in a monthly column for The Runner magazine.  His monthly journal, the Mirkin Report, reportedly had over 25,000 subscribers.

The Sportsmedicine Book
Mirkin's book (written in collaboration with Marshall Hoffman), The Sportsmedicine Book, is considered to be one of his most noted works.  It discusses and exposes the prevailing myths of sports medicine, and offers what Mirkin considers to be useful facts in their place.

Radio hosting 
Mirkin was offered his own regular radio show by WCAU executives in December 1978. A mini-studio was built in his home from which he broadcast live via a remote hookup with the station every weeknight.  Based on ratings, the show was most popular among people aged 35 to 64.

Mirkin had a program on the Talk America Radio Networks that was broadcast by over 75 stations in the United States and Canada.  His show centered on callers asking questions regarding health, fitness, and nutrition.  

He has also had a daily fitness feature called Dr. Gabe Mirkin on Fitness broadcast for CBS Radio News during the 1970s.

American talk radio networks 
In July 2019, on Talk Radio 98.5 WRTA's The 11th Hour with Doug Herendeen, Mirkin discussed a possible solution to Alzheimer's disease.  On the show, he discussed medical articles sent by Herendeen, the host, and shared his opinion on the suggested possible alternative method to curing Alzheimer's disease.  Mirkin also interacted with callers to discuss their ailments, and to provide recommendations, along with further medical knowledge.

Controversies

Antibiotics as cure for rheumatoid arthritis 
Mirkin's syndicated column in The Philadelphia Inquirer was dropped in 1976 due to receiving angry letters fueled by Mirkin's non-standard advice on treating rheumatoid arthritis with antibiotics, and other matters, along with the suspicion that he did not have a large readership.  When questioned about the decision, Joseph Gambardello, Inquirer deputy features editor, said that "It seemed as if Mirkin was, on any particular subject, just focusing on one possible cure or treatment without recognizing the possibility that the condition might have been something else, might have required other treatments, or that there even were other treatments."

Mirkin's views were supported by a study presented to the American College of Rheumatology in November 1997, where the early administration of an antibiotic showed significant improvements in the swollen, painful joints of rheumatoid arthritis.

Before this study, Warner Barth, chairman of rheumatology at the Washington Hospital Center, endorsed the then-standard view that rheumatoid arthritis is not caused by infection.  According to Barth at that time, the benefits patients saw from antibiotics appeared to come from the drugs' anti-inflammatory properties.  Mirkin, however, continued to insist that rheumatoid arthritis is caused by infection.  Since the 1997 findings were released, Barth has stated that he has a somewhat more positive opinion of the treatment, but remains wary of it.

References 

1935 births
20th-century American journalists
20th-century American male writers
20th-century American physicians
21st-century American male writers
21st-century American physicians
American columnists
American male journalists
American talk radio hosts
Baylor College of Medicine alumni
Georgetown University Medical Center faculty
Harvard University alumni
Living people
University System of Maryland faculty